Mitchell Stahl (born August 31, 1994) is an American professional volleyball player, a member of the US national team, and a participant at the Olympic Games Tokyo 2020.

Honours

Clubs
 National championships
 2018/2019  French Championship, with Tours VB
 2018/2019  French Cup, with Tours VB

Individual awards
 2017: Pan American Cup – Best Middle Blocker

References

External links
 Player profile at TeamUSA.org
 
 Player profile at PlusLiga.pl 
 Player profile at Volleybox.net
 UCLA Bruins 2017 roster – Mitchell Stahl

1994 births
Living people
People from Chambersburg, Pennsylvania
American men's volleyball players
Olympic volleyball players of the United States
Volleyball players at the 2020 Summer Olympics
American expatriate sportspeople in France
Expatriate volleyball players in France
American expatriate sportspeople in Belgium
Expatriate volleyball players in Belgium
American expatriate sportspeople in Poland
Expatriate volleyball players in Poland
American expatriate sportspeople in China
Expatriate volleyball players in China
UCLA Bruins men's volleyball players
Paris Volley players
Stal Nysa players
Middle blockers